Institute of Chartered Secretaries of Bangladesh (ICSB), established in 2010 under the Chartered Secretaries Act 2010, is a public institute for training of company secretaries of Bangladesh. The institute is a statutory body, which falls under the Ministry of Commerce of Government of Bangladesh.

History
The Institute of Chartered Secretaries and Managers of Bangladesh (ICSMB), a national professional institute, was established in July 1997 under license from the Companies Act 1994. Subsequently, on 7 June 2010, parliament unanimously passed the Chartered Secretaries Bill 2010. On 16 June 2010, the Institute of Chartered Secretaries of Bangladesh (ICSB) has since been converted into a statutory body under the Chartered Secretaries Act, 2010. The Institute of Chartered Secretaries of Bangladesh is administered by a Council consisting of 13 elected members and 5 nominees of the government of Bangladesh. The ICSB National Award 2014 for Corporate Governance Excellence was held in November 2015 and 3rd ICSB National Award for Corporate Governance Excellence 2015 was on December 24, 2016, at Pan Pacific Sonargaon Hotel.

Professional course by ICSB
Chartered Secretarial Course is the highest professional degree offered by the ICSB Institute. The CS course consists of 18 papers during the course period of 2.5 years in 5 semesters. Each paper has 100 marks. It offers courses twice in a year, for January–June session in December and for July–December session in June. The student handbook contains details of its academic professional courses. The secretarial standard is also maintained.

Comparing ICSB with other professional bodies
The prime task of ICSB is to create professional in order for ensuring sound corporate governance in banks, Insurance and other financial institutions in Bangladesh. In Bangladesh, Institute of Chartered Accountants of Bangladesh, Institute of Cost and Management Accountants of Bangladesh, Bangladesh Insurance Academy and ICSB itself creates Chartered Accountants, Cost & Management Accountants, Chartered Insurers, and Chartered Secretaries respectively for financial services industry of the country.

International affiliation
The institute has the affiliation with the following institution: 
 The Corporate Secretaries International Association (CSIA)

References

External links
 The Official Website of ICSB

Professional associations based in Bangladesh
Government agencies of Bangladesh
Company secretaries
Government agencies established in 2010